Gloria Estela La Riva (born August 13, 1954) is an American perennial political candidate, and communist activist with the Party for Socialism and Liberation (PSL) and the Peace and Freedom Party. She was the PSL's nominee and the Peace and Freedom's nominee in the 2020 presidential election, her tenth consecutive candidacy as either a presidential or vice presidential candidate. She was previously a member of the Workers World Party. She ran as the PSL's and the Peace and Freedom Party's presidential candidate in the 2016 presidential election, with Eugene Puryear and Dennis J. Banks as her running mates respectively. She was the PSL's presidential nominee in the 2008 presidential election. For the 2020 election, Sunil Freeman was her running mate.

Life and career

La Riva was born in Albuquerque, New Mexico, on August 13, 1954. She graduated from high school and began attending Brandeis University in 1972. She was a third-party candidate for President of the United States in the 1992 presidential election, representing the Workers World Party. She had also been the Workers World Party vice-presidential candidate in the elections of 1984, 1988, 1996, and 2000.

La Riva is a founding member of the Party for Socialism and Liberation.

La Riva was also the Peace and Freedom Party candidate for Governor of California in 1994, receiving 72,774 votes (0.9%). She ran again in the 1998 gubernatorial election, capturing 59,218 votes (0.71%).  She also ran for San Francisco Mayor in 1983 (7,328 votes – 5.4%), coming in third overall, and second in the working class wards of the city, and 1991 (2,552 votes – 1.4%), and for Congress in 2010 (3rd place – 3%).

In the 2008 Presidential election, La Riva received 6,821 votes, the 10th highest vote total.
La Riva has also been the director of the National Committee to Free the Cuban Five, and president of the typographical sector of the Northern California Media Workers Union.

In 2010, La Riva was the Peace and Freedom Party's candidate for U.S. Congress in California's 8th Congressional District. Running against Democratic House Speaker Nancy Pelosi, she came in third, receiving 5,161 votes, 3% of the overall vote. Also in 2010, La Riva was awarded the Friendship Medal by the Cuban Council of State.

In the 2012 presidential election, La Riva was a presidential stand-in for Peta Lindsay, the PSL nominee for president who was not allowed on the ballot in some states due to her age. La Riva was on the ballot in Colorado, Iowa, Utah, and Wisconsin, and she received 1,608 votes, or less than 0.01% of the total votes.

In July 2015, she was announced as the PSL's 2016 presidential nominee, with Eugene Puryear as her running mate. She attained ballot access in eight states: Vermont, New Mexico, Iowa, Louisiana, Colorado, Washington, New Jersey, and California. She received 74,401 votes in the election, or 0.05% of the total votes.

La Riva was a candidate for the Peace and Freedom Party nomination for Governor of California in 2018. She received 19,075 votes in the nonpartisan blanket primary, or 0.3% of the total votes.

She received the Party of Socialism and Liberation nomination for the 2020 presidential election, with Leonard Peltier as her running mate. Peltier later stepped down from the ticket due to his deteriorating health and was replaced by Sunil Freeman. Additionally, she won the Peace & Freedom Party primary in California for the 2020 United States presidential election, beating Green Party candidate Howie Hawkins. She also won the nomination of the Liberty Union Party in Vermont. She obtained no electoral votes in the election, and a total of 85,623 nationally, or about 0.05% of the total, being sixth most voted candidate, after Rocky de la Fuente, and ahead of Kanye West.

Other activities
La Riva has translated Fidel Castro's book Cuba at the Crossroads (1997) , and produced the documentary videos NATO Targets, Workers' Democracy in Cuba (1996), Genocide by Sanctions: The Case of Iraq (1998) and Let Iraq Live!

Personal
She is married to Richard Becker, whose brother is PSL co-founder Brian Becker.

References

External links

2020 campaign website
2020 campaign Twitter profile
2016 campaign website
"Standing for Castro at the US election", a brief report on Gloria La Riva by France 24, October 29, 2008
 "Meet Gloria", profile on Votepsl.org
 

1954 births
Living people
1984 United States vice-presidential candidates
1988 United States vice-presidential candidates
1996 United States vice-presidential candidates
2000 United States vice-presidential candidates
20th-century American politicians
21st-century American politicians
21st-century American women politicians
American anti-poverty advocates
American anti–Iraq War activists
American communists
American documentary filmmakers
Brandeis University alumni
Candidates in the 1992 United States presidential election
Candidates in the 2008 United States presidential election
Candidates in the 2012 United States presidential election
Candidates in the 2016 United States presidential election
Candidates in the 2018 United States elections
Candidates in the 2020 United States presidential election
Female candidates for President of the United States
Female candidates for Vice President of the United States
Hispanic and Latino American candidates for President of the United States
Hispanic and Latino American women in politics
Mexican-American people in California politics
Party for Socialism and Liberation politicians
Peace and Freedom Party presidential nominees
Politicians from Albuquerque, New Mexico
American women documentary filmmakers
Women in California politics
Workers World Party presidential nominees
Workers World Party vice presidential nominees